is a Japanese sprinter. He competed in the men's 4 × 400 metres relay at the 1984 Summer Olympics.

References

1965 births
Living people
Place of birth missing (living people)
Japanese male sprinters
Japanese male hurdlers
Olympic male sprinters
Olympic male hurdlers
Olympic athletes of Japan
Athletes (track and field) at the 1984 Summer Olympics
Athletes (track and field) at the 1988 Summer Olympics
Asian Games silver medalists for Japan
Asian Games medalists in athletics (track and field)
Athletes (track and field) at the 1986 Asian Games
Medalists at the 1986 Asian Games
Universiade bronze medalists for Japan
Universiade medalists in athletics (track and field)
Medalists at the 1987 Summer Universiade
World Athletics Championships athletes for Japan
Japan Championships in Athletics winners